Cedar Grove, Virginia may refer to:
Cedar Grove, Brunswick County, Virginia
Cedar Grove, Frederick County, Virginia
Cedar Grove, Northampton County, Virginia
Cedar Grove, Rockbridge County, Virginia